Prospero Zannichelli (1698-1772) was a painter from Reggio Emilia, Italy, who was active in Reggio Emilia, Alessandria, Piacenza, and Turin. He was known as a painter of landscapes and decorative scenery.

References

18th-century Italian painters
Italian male painters
1698 births
1772 deaths
18th-century Italian male artists